The 1924 Missouri Tigers football team was an American football team that represented the University of Missouri in the Missouri Valley Intercollegiate Athletic Association (Missouri Valley) during the 1924 college football season. The team compiled a 7–2 record (5–1 against Missouri Valley opponents), won the Missouri Valley championship, and outscored all opponents by a combined total of 110 to 41. Gwinn Henry was the head coach for the second of nine seasons. The team played its home games at Rollins Field in Columbia, Missouri.

Schedule

References

Missouri
Missouri Tigers football seasons
Missouri Valley Conference football champion seasons
Missouri Tigers football